Best Player is a 2011 comedy television film that aired on Nickelodeon on March 13, 2011. The movie stars Jerry Trainor and Jennette McCurdy, from the show iCarly. Filming started on October 24, 2009 in Victoria, British Columbia, Canada and wrapped up production on November 18, 2009.

Plot
Quincy Johnson (Jerry Trainor) is a barely employed adult gamer who lives at home with his parents. Quincy plays video games under the username "Q" and is renowned in the gaming community for his many awards and world records. Much to Quincy's dismay, his parents decide to sell their house, meaning Quincy will need to find a new place of residence. Quincy decides to try to buy the house from them for $175,000. He plans on getting the money from a tournament for a new video game called "Black Hole", where the grand prize is $175,000. He discusses the dilemma with his number one fan, Wendell (Amir Talai). While practicing for the tournament, Quincy finds a player named "Prodigy" whom he cannot defeat. Quincy and Wendell decide to find out who Prodigy really is to secure Quincy's chance of winning the tournament, also because Quincy needs a place to stay. Wendell picks Quincy up and finds out that Prodigy lives nearby. They seek a plan to beat Prodigy while together.

When they find Prodigy's house, Quincy discovers that Prodigy is actually a sullen high school girl named Christina Saunders (Jennette McCurdy), ("Chris" for short), who thinks that he is her mom Tracy's (Janet Varney) internet date. But the plan almost fails when Mr. Johnson, Tracy's real Internet date, arrives, however, Wendell manages to stall him. Quincy decides he will have to go on a date with her, so on his and Tracy's first date, Quincy lies to her, saying that he is a home economics teacher at Chris' school. Tracy tells Chris, in front of Quincy, that if Chris gets any more F's she will not be allowed to play any video games. The next day, Wendell has set up Quincy to be the home economics teacher at Chris's school. Later, Chris goes to science class and is the first to present her project which Quincy and Wendell had sabotaged the previous night so that she would fail and not be able to play in the tournament. It goes awry and ends up with Chris getting an A+, and she gloats to Quincy about the $175,500 she will win at the tournament.

The next day, Quincy asks several boys if any one of them will take Chris to the prom, which is on the same day of the tournament. No one shows any interest and they all leave except Sheldon (Nick Benson) who reveals that he has had an unnoticed crush on Chris. Quincy takes Sheldon to the library and they research pick-up lines on the computer so they can research how to woo Chris. Quincy then tells Sheldon to sign up for the football tryouts. Unfortunately, Sheldon, being a complete nerd, is tackled by a stronger jock and given a massive, humiliating, almost atomic wedgie in front of Chris. The bully, however, doesn't stop there, dangle Sheldon by the wedgie in front of the entire bleachers full of girls. After a full minute of dangling Sheldon by his briefs, Sheldon's friend Ash convinces the bully to let go of his underpants and drop Sheldon to the floor. Quincy realizes that Chris likes Ash (Jean-Luc Bilodeau).

Later on a field trip to a video arcade planned by Quincy, Ash asks Chris to prom much to her delight. Chris, later on, tells Quincy and Tracy that Ash asked her to the prom, and she will be missing the tournament. Quincy assures her there will be more tournaments, and they look on the Internet for some other tournaments, when Chris sees Quincy on a magazine cover about video games. Realizing Quincy is Q, Chris spitefully decides to "destroy" him at the tournament, even rejecting Ash's prom invitation to do so, while Tracy appears and asks Quincy to leave after he tells her the truth. After leaving, Wendell tells Quincy that he is also competing in the tournament and kicks Quincy out of his house for choosing Tracy over gaming.

The next day they go to the tournament, Quincy, Wendell, and Chris each win in their respective first rounds. Sheldon (going by the name "Shell-Shock") appears, after having been released from the hospital. Quincy admits to Tracy that he loves her and has feelings for her, but Wendell convinces everyone to think it's "smack talk", which inadvertently humiliates and embarrasses Tracy in front of everyone and further worsens the rift between Quincy and Tracy. Tracy, however, who knows that is not true, is not sure about what he said. For the final event, Wendell asks Quincy if he'll work with him to destroy Chris and when they win they will share the award fifty-fifty. Quincy doesn't reply and jumps on Prodigy/Chris; leading everyone on that he will destroy her, but then he works with her to destroy Wendell. But in Quincy's final strike, Wendell and Quincy destroy each other. Chris appears to be the winner, but the game is not over. Sheldon/Shell-Shock, thought to have been defeated, gets up and defeats Chris/Prodigy to win the game.

Ash appears from the crowd to Chris's surprise. He congratulates her despite not winning and says he intended to spend the evening with her anyway, and that there is still time to go to the prom. Quincy apologizes to and reconciles with Tracy and asks her to the prom, to which she accepts. In the ending credits, you see prom photos of Ash, Tracy, Chris, and Quincy.

Cast
 Jerry Trainor as Quincy Johnson
 Jennette McCurdy as Chris "Prodigy" Saunders
 Amir Talai as Wendell
 Janet Varney as Tracy Saunders
 Nick Benson as Sheldon
 Jean-Luc Bilodeau as Ash McPhee
 Gabrielle Rose as Mrs. Johnson
 Malcolm Stewart as Mr. Johnson
 Julia Maxwell as Cindy
 Jesse Wheeler as Bob
 Lissa Neptuno as Jenny
 Kevin O'Grady as Principal Cooper
 Colin Foo as Old Bobby
 Dan Joffre as Mr. Ingleby
 Kevin Crofton as Tourist Dad
 Patricia Drake as Tourist Mom
 Calum Worthy as Zastrow
 Karissa Tynes as Permission Slip Girl
 Osric Chau as Ash's Friend
 Adom Osei as Laser Tag Pre-Teen
 BJ Harrison as Public Librarian
 Dejan Loyola as Eviscer8r
 Jan Bos as Contest Referee
 Talon Dunbar as Wendell's Opponent
 Jesse Reid as Chris's Opponent
 Nick Carey as Sheldon's Opponent
 Rekha Sharma as Brenda
 Baljodh Nagra as Mikey
 Ryan Harder as Benny
 Elfina Luk as Mrs. Chen
 Marc Gaudet as Italian Waiter #1
 Milo Shandel as Italian Waiter #2
 Nancy Ebert as High School Librarian
 Nico Ghisi as Kicker Kid
 Doug Chapman as Tracy's Internet Date
 Kevin Michael Richardson as Black Hole Video Game Announcer (V.O.)

Home media
The film was released on DVD on November 8, 2013, and on Blu-ray on December 4, 2015. On November 3, 2020, the movie was added to Paramount+ (formerly CBS All Access).

References

External links
 
 

2011 television films
2011 films
2011 computer-animated films
Films about video games
American films with live action and animation
Nickelodeon original films
Films shot in Vancouver
Films directed by Damon Santostefano
American computer-animated films
Canadian computer-animated films
2010s English-language films
2010s American films
2010s Canadian films